The 1940 United States presidential election in Rhode Island took place on November 5, 1940. All contemporary 48 states were part of the 1940 United States presidential election. State voters chose four electors to the Electoral College, which selected the president and vice president.

Rhode Island was won by incumbent Democratic President Franklin D. Roosevelt of New York, who was running against Republican businessman Wendell Willkie of New York. Roosevelt ran with former Secretary of Agriculture Henry A. Wallace of Iowa as his running mate, and Willkie ran with Senator Charles L. McNary of Oregon.

Roosevelt won Rhode Island by a margin of 13.56%.

Results

By county

See also
 United States presidential elections in Rhode Island

References

Rhode Island
1940
1940 Rhode Island elections